The 2009 Copa Sudamericana Finals was a two-legged football match-up to determine the 2009 Copa Sudamericana champion. It was contested by Ecuadorian club LDU Quito and Brazilian club Fluminense. Both teams were playing in their first Copa Sudamericana finals. The first leg was played in Estadio Casa Blanca in Quito on 25 November, and the host team LDU Quito won 5–1. The second leg was played in Estádio Mário Filho, better known as Maracanã, in Rio de Janeiro on 2 December and the host team Fluminese won 3–0, but LDU Quito won 5–4 on aggregate and was thus crowned the champions. Coincidentally, the finals were a rematch of the 2008 Copa Libertadores Finals, which were contested under similar circumstances 17 months prior to the day.

Qualified teams

Rules
The final was played over two legs; home and away. The higher seeded team played the second leg at home. The team that accumulated the most points —three for a win, one for a draw, zero for a loss— after the two legs was crowned the champion. The away-goals rule was not used. Should the two teams be tied on points after the second leg, the team with the best goal difference won. If the two teams had equal goal difference, extra time would be used. The extra time consisted of two 15-minute halves. If the tie was still not broken, a penalty shoot-out would ensue according to the Laws of the Game.

Route to the finals 

Both teams entered the competition in the First Stage. Fluminense qualified after finishing 14th in the 2008 Campeonato Brasileiro Série A. LDU Quito qualified after finishing second in the First Stage of the 2009 Campeonato Ecuatoriano de Fútbol Serie A.

Fluminense's route
Fluminense's First Stage was bitter cross-town rival Flamengo. Both matches of the Fla-Flu in the tournament were held Maracanã, and both ended in a draw (0–0 and 1–1, respectively). Fluminense, as the designated away in the second leg, advanced on an away goal by Roni. For winning Qualifier O5 of the First Stage, Fluminense was awarded the 5 seed for the Round of 16 onward. 

Their Round of 16 rival was Peruvian club Alianza Atlético. The first leg, held in Estadio Miguel Grau in Piura, ended in a 2–2 draw. Flu's goals were scored by Luiz Alberto and Conca. The second leg, held in Maracanã, ended in a decisive 4–1 for Fluminense. Conca, Alan, and Adeílson (twice) made the scores for the Brazilians, and passage to the Quarterfinals. 

Their Quarterfinals rival was Chilean club Universidad de Chile. The first leg, at Maracanã, ended in another draw (2–2). Fred scored twice for Fluminense. In the second leg, held at Estadio Santa Laura in Santiago, Fred scored the lone goal of the match to give Fluminense passage to the Semifinals. 

Fluminense's Semifinal rival was Paraguayan club Cerro Porteño. The first leg was held at Estadio General Pablo Rojas, nicknamed La Olla, in Asunción, and ended in a 1–0 for Fluminense. Fred scored his fourth goal in three matches for the advantage. In the second leg at Maracanã, Fluminense trailed for most of the game thanks to a Cerro Porteño goal by Luis Cáceres. However, Gum and Alan each scored a goal for Fluminense in stoppage time of the second half to give Flu the win and passage to the Finals.

LDU Quito's route
LDU Quito's First Stage rival was Paraguayan club Libertad. The first leg, held in Estadio Casa Blanca in Quito, ended in a 1–0 win for Liga. Team captain Néicer Reasco scored the goal for the home team. The second leg, held back in Asunción at the Estadio Defensores del Chaco, ended in a 1–1 tie. Édison Méndez scored the come from behind goal for Liga to give them passage to the Round of 16, and the 10 seed.

Liga played the Round of 16 against Argentine club Lanús. The first leg, held in Quito, was a goal-fest for Liga. A hat-trick by Claudio Bieler and a goal by Édison Méndez gave LDU Quito a 4–0 win and a significant advantage in the next leg. The second leg, held in Estadio Ciudad de Lanús, ended in a 1–1 draw. Claudio Bieler again scored for Liga. 

LDU Quito Quarterfinal rival was defending Argentine champion Vélez Sarsfield. The first leg, held in Estadio José Amalfitani in Buenos Aires, ended in a 1–1 draw. Claudio Bieler again scored for Liga, who were trailing to give them the draw. The second leg, held back in Quito, ended in 2–1 win for the home team. Initially trailing 1–0, goals by Enrique Vera and Carlos Espínola gave LDU Quito passage to the Semifinals. 

Liga's Semifinal rival was Uruguayan club River Plate. The first leg, held at the Estadio Centenario in Montevideo, ended in a 2–1 loss for LDU Quito. Édison Méndez scored the lone goal for Liga. The second leg, held back in Quito, ended in a hugely one-sided 7–0 win for LDU Quito. The goals were provided by Claudio Bieler (hat-trick), Carlos Espínola, Miller Bolaños, Édison Méndez, and Ulises de la Cruz.

Summary

Matches

First leg
The first leg, played at Estadio Casa Blanca in Quito, began much like it did in 2008: with a quick goal. This time, Fluminense quickly struck first with a goal by Marquinho in the first minute. Liga answered back with a hat-trick by Édison Méndez, who made two powerful long-range shots (21st and 44th minutes) and a header (60th minute). He later assisted Franklin Salas' goal in the 78th minute. Ulises de la Cruz capped off the scoring with another long-range shot from outside the box in the 87th minute. The win gave Liga a favorable 4-goal advantage going into the second leg.

Second leg
The match started with a goal scored by Diguinho in the 14th minute. When LDU Quito player Ulises de la Cruz was given a red card in the 18th minute, Fluminense increased the pressure on the Ecuadorians. Two minutes before half-time, Fred scored the second for Fluminense. At half-time, Fluminense curiously stayed on the pitch. The second half continued with Fluminense continuing the pressure. Gum scored the third for the Brazilian side in the 72nd minute. The match grew more intensive as time went on. Fluminense captain Fred was sent-off in the 76th minute for arguing and touching the referee. LDU Quito defender Jairo Campos was shown his second yellow card 82nd minute and was ejected. With LDU Quito left with 9 players and Fluminense left with 10, Fluminense continued their search for the fourth goal, which would have sent the game into extra time. Fluminense never got the goal, and LDU Quito were crowned Copa Sudamericana champions for the first time.

References

Finals
Copa Sudamericana Finals
Copa Sudamericana Finals 2009
Copa Sudamericana Finals 2009
Copa Sudamericana Finals
Copa Sudamericana Finals